Floresville Independent School District is a public school district based in Floresville, Texas (USA).

Located in Wilson County, a very small portion of the district extends into Bexar County.

In 2009, the school district was rated "Recognized" by the Texas Education Agency.

Schools
Floresville High School (Grades 9-12)
Floresville Middle School (Grades 6-8)
Floresville North Elementary (Grades K-5)
Floresville South Elementary (Grades K-5)
Floresville Early Childhood (PK)
Floresville Alternative School

References

External links
 

School districts in Wilson County, Texas
School districts in Bexar County, Texas